Baskov ( or Баськов) is a Russian masculine surname, its feminine counterpart is Baskova. It may refer to:
Nikolay Baskov (born 1976), Russian singer
Roman Baskov (born 1978), Russian football player
Svetlana Baskova (born 1965), Russian film director, scenarist and painter
Vladislav Baskov (born 1975), Russian football midfielder 

Russian-language surnames